The Velino is a river in central Italy, a tributary of the Nera. Its source is located on Monte Pozzoni's slopes (1,903 m) near Cittareale. Aftwards it runs through a narrow valley next the Mount Terminillo, known as "Gole del Vento" ("Wind's Ravines") and, near Antrodoco, receives the Peschiera Springs, which have a discharge of some 18 m³/s (9.5 m³/s is sent to Rome) through an aqueduct.

Near Papigno, it falls into the Nera forming the famous Cascate delle Marmore falls.

In pre-Roman times the river ended in a marsh within the plain of Rieti. The falls were created by consul Manius Curius Dentatus and enlarged in medieval times, being updated to the current state in the 18th century by architect Andrea Vici.

References

External links

Rivers of the Province of Rieti
Rivers of Italy